Elections to Hyndburn Borough Council were held on 5 May 2011. One third of the council-seats were up for election.

Background
Before the election  Conservatives had a single-seat majority of 18 councillors, Labour had 15 councillors, while Independent (politician) had 2 councillors.

Conservative and Labour candidates contested for every ward-seat. Independents were defending a single-seat, but 'various' candidates were contesting five-wards. Ukip's only single candidate contested in the Central-ward.

Local Election result
After the election, the composition of the council was -

Labour 18
Conservative 14
Independent 3

The four (out of 16) Hyndburn Local Borough Council ward seats that were NOT up for re-election in 2011 included the following wards - Netherton in Gt. Harwood, Peel and Spring Hill in Accrington, plus St. Andrews in Oswaldtwistle.

Ward results

Altham

Barnfield

Baxenden

Central

Church

Clayton-le-Moors

Huncoat

Immanuel

Milnshaw

Overton

Rishton

St. Oswald's

References

2011 English local elections
2011
2010s in Lancashire